Dimorphandra mollis, the Fava d'anta, is a tree species in the genus of Dimorphandra. It is a plant of the Cerrado vegetation of Brazil. The seeds are known to be toxic to cattle.

Fava d'anta contains astilbin, rutin and quercetin.

References

Caesalpinioideae